Lost River Peak, also known as Lost River Mountain, at  above sea level is the sixth-highest peak in the U.S. state of Idaho and the fifth-highest in the Lost River Range. The peak is located in Salmon-Challis National Forest in Custer County.

References 

Mountains of Custer County, Idaho
Mountains of Idaho
Salmon-Challis National Forest